C. Everett Koop, M.D. is a five-part American documentary television series hosted by C. Everett Koop. The series premiered June 4, 1991, on NBC.

Production
The series was conceived as a look at the latest technology in medicine, however Koop changed the focus to emphasize the failures within the American health care system. Each episode was shot using a different production crew. The series took five months to film.

Episodes

Reception
Ken Tucker of Entertainment Weekly rated the series a B, calling it "pretty interesting". Tucker continued by saying that "the scripts are just a tad banal", but that Koop's "intelligence and sincerity come through in his deft, informed interviewing style". Ray Richmond of the Orange County Register stated that the series is "forthright and intelligent" despite Koop's penchant for being "a tad overbearing with his scholarly demeanor and bullying manner".

References

External links

1990s American documentary television series
1991 American television series debuts
1991 American television series endings
NBC original programming